Dame Josephine Clare Barstow,  (born 27 September 1940) is an English operatic soprano.

Education and early career
Josephine Barstow was born in Sheffield and educated at the University of Birmingham.  She made her professional debut (Mimì in La bohème) with the touring company Opera for All in 1964. She won a scholarship to study during 1965–66 at the London Opera Centre, where she met her husband Ande Anderson (d. 1996). During the following season, she sang Gluck's Euridice and Verdi's Violetta for the Sadler's Wells Opera Company and in 1968 she began a three-year contract with Welsh National Opera. In 1969 she made her Royal Opera debut as one of the nieces in Peter Grimes

Subsequent career
Among other roles with the Royal Opera, she has sung Alice Ford (Falstaff), Santuzza (Cavalleria rusticana), Ellen Orford in Peter Grimes, Leonore (Fidelio) and the Old Countess (The Queen of Spades).  She also appeared  in the world premières of two operas by Sir Michael Tippett:
The Knot Garden (as Denise) and The Ice Break (as Gayle).

At Glyndebourne, she has appeared as Lady Macbeth, Elettra (Idomeneo) and Leonore. Roles with English National Opera include an acclaimed Violetta, Emilia Marty (The Makropulos Case), Natasha in the British stage première of War and Peace and the title roles in Salome, Aida, Arabella, Lady Macbeth of Mtsensk and Der Rosenkavalier. Rehearsals for Salome and an interview with Barstow were featured in a December 1975 episode of the BBC television programme Arena.

Among other engagements outside the British Isles, she has appeared at the New York Metropolitan Opera, Lyric Opera of Chicago, the Vienna State Opera and the Bayreuth Festival. 

Latterly, she has performed a number of roles with Opera North, including Alice Ford, Lady Macbeth, Kostelnicka in Jenůfa, Marie in Wozzeck, Lady Billows in Albert Herring and in the title roles of Gloriana, Médée and Aida. Also for Opera North in 2021 (revived 2022) she sang, and spoke, the role of Madame Armfeldt in A Little Night Music by Stephen Sondheim.

On 22 March 1986 Barstow reprised her role as Salome, this time at the Seattle Opera House, performing the Dance of the Seven Veils. She danced a choreography by Mark Morris, wearing a costume designed by Sarah Nash Gates, involving the literal removal of seven veils. At the end of the number Barstow was wearing only a G-string.

On 16 November 1986 Barstow performed an opera gala night for Opera North with David Lloyd Jones as conductor.

In October 2011 she appeared as the Countess in The Queen of Spades, also with Opera North.

Barstow plays Heidi Schiller in the National Theatre's 2017 production of Stephen Sondheim's Follies.

Personal life
Barstow was married to Terry Hands from 1964 to 1967, and then to Ande Anderson from 1968 until his death in 1996.

Selected recordings

CDs
Albert Herring (conductor Steuart Bedford), 1996, Naxos
Un ballo in maschera (conductor Herbert von Karajan), 1989, DG
Gloriana (conductor Charles Mackerras), 1993, Decca
The Knot Garden (conductor Colin Davis), 1974, Philips
Kiss Me, Kate (conductor John McGlinn), EMI
Oliver! (conductor John Owen Edwards), JAY Records
Street Scene (conductor John Mauceri), 1991, Decca
Opera Finales (Salome, Médée, The Makropulos Affair, Turandot) (conductor John Mauceri), 1990, Decca

DVDs
Un ballo in maschera (conductor Sir Georg Solti), 2005, TDK
Gloriana (conductor Paul Daniel), 2000, Opus Arte
Idomeneo (conductor John Pritchard), 1974, Arthaus Musik
Macbeth (conductor John Pritchard), 1972, Arthaus Musik
Owen Wingrave (conductor Kent Nagano), 2001, Arthaus Musik

Honours
Appointed a Commander of the Order of the British Empire (CBE) in the 1985 New Year Honours, Josephine Barstow was promoted to Dame Commander of the Order of the British Empire (DBE) in the 1995 Birthday Honours.

Dame Josephine Barstow is currently represented by Musichall Ltd.

References

Who's Who in British Opera; ed. Nicky Adam (Scolar Press, 1993);

External links
Biography  
Reviews  
Recordings 
Repertoire

Interview with Josephine Barstow, October 30, 1981

1940 births
Alumni of the University of Birmingham
Dames Commander of the Order of the British Empire
Singers awarded knighthoods
English operatic sopranos
Living people
Musicians from Sheffield
20th-century British women opera singers
21st-century British women opera singers